Andy Puddicombe (born 23 September 1972) is a British author, public speaker and a teacher of meditation and mindfulness. He, alongside Richard Pierson, is the co-founder of Headspace, a digital health company that provides guided meditation training and mindfulness for its users.

Puddicombe is a former Buddhist monk with a degree in Circus Arts.

Early life and education
Puddicombe was born in London but grew up in Bristol, UK. He attended Wellsway Comprehensive School in Keynsham, and studied Sports Science at De Montfort University. He also achieved a Foundation Degree in Circus Arts.

Career

Buddhism
In 1994, Puddicombe gave up his studies in sports science and travelled to Asia to train as a Buddhist monk. He has attributed this in part to an effort to cope with the trauma of bereavement.

His meditation training took him to India, Nepal, Myanmar, Thailand, Australia and Russia; culminating in full ordination at a Tibetan monastery in India, in the Himalayas. Having completed a one-year cloistered retreat in Scotland, he returned to Russia, where he taught meditation in Moscow for four years before reaching the end of his monastic commitment.

In 2004 Puddicombe returned to the UK where he studied Circus Arts in London while simultaneously building his own private meditation practice in the city, wanting to make "meditation and mindfulness accessible, relevant and beneficial to as many people as possible".

Meditation consultant

Puddicombe set up a private meditation practice in 2006, and spent the next four years working as a mindfulness consultant, while adapting the language and techniques he had previously learned. During this time he met his future business partner and co-founder of Headspace, Rich Pierson. Puddicombe has often attributed the success of Headspace to Pierson's involvement.

Headspace

Headspace launched in 2010, originally as an events company in London. Its first online meditations were uploaded to its website before January 2012, when the first Headspace app was launched.

Writing
Puddicombe has written three books, all published by Hodder & Stoughton, Hachette.
 Get Some Headspace (2011) is an in-depth introduction to the Headspace techniques. (also published as Meditation and Mindfulness)
 The Headspace Diet (2013) teaches readers how to use mindfulness rather than fad-diets to reach their ideal personal weight. (also published as Mindful Eating)
 The Headspace Guide to...a Mindful Pregnancy (2015) sets out to teach couples how to calmly navigate the anxieties and demands of pregnancy.

Puddicombe is a regular contributor to The Guardian, The Times, Five Books and Huffington Post, writing about the benefits of mindfulness.

Television and radio
In 2013, Puddicombe was featured on the BBC science documentary, Horizon 'The Truth About Personality', in which the Headspace app was tested for efficacy. In laboratory experiments carried out over 7 weeks, the BBC Presenter, Dr Michael Mosley, experienced progressively less negative thought, whilst overcoming more than a decade of insomnia.
Puddicombe also launched a podcast named "Radio Headspace" where he started with 3-5 minute episodes of "short and sweet bits" of information to help your day, often where he shares some personal stories and asks you to do something in your life more mindfully. As of recently, (November 2022), there have been guest hosts on the podcast.

Puddicombe contributes to BBC News and BBC Radio on matters of meditation, mindfulness, mental health and lifestyle. In 2010 he took part in the Pause For Thought series on BBC Radio 2, with weekly appearances on the Chris Evans radio show, with over 9 million listeners. This is alongside other contributions to stations such as NPR (National Public Radio) in the US.

Puddicombe's first appearance on US TV came in 2013, taking part in the Dr Oz show. He discussed the rise of meditation, the scientific benefits, as well as his personal journey as a Buddhist monk. He then hosted a separate segment in which he taught the studio audience and television viewers how to meditate. He has also appeared on other network shows, such as ABC and KTLA News, discussing the benefits of meditation.

In August 2017, Puddicombe was a guest on The Tonight Show Starring Jimmy Fallon. During his appearance, he guided the show's host, The Roots, and the audience through a two-minute meditation.

TED Talk
In November 2012, Puddicombe gave a TED Talk, entitled 'All It Takes Is 10 Mindful Minutes', outlining the benefits of taking time out each day to practice mindfulness. To date it has accrued 13 million views, and was among the first TED Talks to be featured on Netflix.

Personal life 
In 2013, Puddicombe announced that he was receiving treatment for testicular cancer. In an interview with the Guardian newspaper, he revealed how mindfulness had helped him to cope with the physical, emotional and mental impact of the illness.

In August 2014, Puddicombe was one of 200 public figures who were signatories to a letter to The Guardian opposing Scottish independence in the run-up to September's referendum on that issue.

In December 2020, Puddicombe moved to Lisbon, Portugal, where he currently lives with his wife and two sons.

See also
 Tibetan Buddhism
 Headspace

References

External links
 
 

1972 births
Living people
Writers from Bristol
Businesspeople from Bristol
Alumni of De Montfort University
English Buddhists
Converts to Buddhism
British Buddhists
Businesspeople from London
Mindfulness movement